Delta Sigma Epsilon may refer to:

 Delta Sigma Epsilon (Greek army), Democratic Army of Greece founded during the 1946–1949 civil war
 Delta Sigma Epsilon (sorority), a national collegiate sorority in the United States, 1914–1956